The Faculty of Mathematics and Computer Science is one of twelve faculties at the University of Heidelberg. It comprises the Institute of Mathematics, the Institute of Applied Mathematics, the School of Applied Sciences, and the Institute of Computer Science. The faculty maintains close relationships to the Interdisciplinary Center for Scientific Computing (IWR) and the Mathematics Center Heidelberg (MATCH). The first chair of mathematics was entrusted to the physician Jacob Curio in the year 1547.

Institute of Mathematics

In 1547, the first chair of mathematics was entrusted to the physician Jacob Curio. Today, areas of research include:

 Complex analysis: automorphic functions and modular forms
 Arithmetic: algebraic number theory, algorithmic algebra, and arithmetical geometry
 Topology and geometry: geometric partial differential equations, algebraic topology, differential topology, and differential geometry

Institute of Applied Mathematics
In 1957, Gottfried Köthe became the first director of the Institute of Applied Mathematics. Today, areas of research include:

 Probability theory and statistics: time-series analysis, nonparametrics, asymptotic statistical procedures, and computer-intensive statistical methods
 Applied analysis, numerical analysis and optimization, notably in the field of modelling and scientific computing.

Institute of Applied Sciences 
In 1969, the Institute of Applied Sciences was founded. Its areas of research include:

 Media Computing, Business Computing and Health Care Computing.
 Communication, Robotics and Strategic Management.

Institute of Computer Science
In 2001, the Institute of Computer Science was founded. Today, areas of research include:

 Computability and computational complexity theory
 Efficient use of high-power computing systems
 Development, administration and use of web-based information systems
 Knowledge management in software development

Noted mathematicians and computer scientists

Moritz Benedikt Cantor: "History of mathematics"
Immanuel Lazarus Fuchs: "Fuchsian group", "Picard–Fuchs equation"
Emil Julius Gumbel: "Gumbel distribution"
Otto Hesse: "Hessian curve", "Hessian matrix", "Hesse normal form"
Leo Koenigsberger
Sofia Kovalevskaya: "Cauchy–Kowalevski theorem"
Emanuel Lasker: "Lasker–Noether theorem"
Jacob Lüroth
Hans Maaß
Max Noether: "Max Noether's theorem"
Oskar Perron: "Perron–Frobenius theorem", "Perron's formula", "Perron integral"
Hermann Schapira
Friedrich Karl Schmidt
Herbert Seifert: "Seifert fiber space", "Seifert surface", "Seifert–van Kampen theorem", "Seifert conjecture", Seifert–Weber space
Paul Stäckel: "twin prime"
William Threlfall
Heinrich Weber: "Kronecker–Weber theorem", "Weber's theorem"

Notes and references

Heidelberg University